Orhan Aksoy may refer to:
 Orhan Aksoy (director) (1930–2008), Turkish director
 Orhan Aksoy (serial killer) (born 1971), Turkish serial killer